In Greek mythology, Mimas (Ancient Greek: Μίμας) was one of the Gigantes (Giants), the offspring of Gaia, born from the blood of the castrated Uranus.

Mythology 
According to the mythographer Apollodorus, he was killed during the Gigantomachy, the cosmic battle of the Giants with the Twelve Olympians, by Hephaestus with "missiles of red-hot metal" from his forge. In Euripides' Ion (c. 410 BC), the chorus, describing the wonders of the late sixth century Temple of Apollo at Delphi, tell of seeing depicted there the Gigantomachy showing, among other things, Zeus burning Mimas "to ashes" with his thunderbolt. In the Argonautica by  Apollonius of Rhodes, and the Gigantomachia by Claudian, Mimas was killed by Ares (or in Claudian's case by Ares' Roman counterpart Mars). Mimas is also mentioned in the company of other Giants, by the Latin writers Horace and Seneca.

A fragment of an Attic black-figure dinos by Lydos (Athens Akropolis 607) dating from the second quarter of the sixth century, which depicted the Gigantomachy, shows Aphrodite with shield and spear battling a Giant also with shield (displaying a large bee) and spear, whose name is inscribed (retrograde) as "Mimos", possibly in error for "Mimas".

He was said to be buried under Prochyte, one of the Phlegraean Islands off the coast of Naples. Claudian mentions Mimas as one of several vanquished Giants whose weapons, as spoils of war, hung on trees in a wood near the summit of Mount Etna.

Mimas is possibly the same as the Giant named Mimon on the Gigantomachy depicted on the north frieze of the Siphnian Treasury at Delphi (c. 525 BC), and a late fifth century BC cup from Vulci (Berlin F2531) shown fighting Ares.

Namesake
In 1847, the mythological Giant inspired the name of the moon closest to Saturn.

See also 
 Alcyoneus
 Aristaeus
 Picolous
 Polybotes

Notes

References
 Apollodorus, Apollodorus, The Library, with an English Translation by Sir James George Frazer, F.B.A., F.R.S. in 2 Volumes. Cambridge, MA, Harvard University Press; London, William Heinemann Ltd. 1921.  Online version at the Perseus Digital Library.
 Apollonius of Rhodes, Apollonius Rhodius: the Argonautica, translated by Robert Cooper Seaton, W. Heinemann, 1912. Internet Archive
 Arafat, K. W., Classical Zeus: A Study in Art and Literature, Clarendon Press, Oxford 1990. .
 Beazley, John D, The Development of Attic Black-Figure, Revised edition, University of California Press,  1986. . Online version at UC Press E-Books Collection
 Brinkmann, Vinzenz, "Die aufgemalten Namensbeischriften an Nord- und Ostfries des Siphnierschatzhauses", Bulletin de Correspondance Hellénique 109 77-130 (1985).
 Claudian, Claudian with an English translation by Maurice Platnauer, Volume II, Loeb Classical Library. Cambridge, MA: Harvard University Press; London: William Heinemann, Ltd.. 1922. Internet Archive. .
 Cook, Arthur Bernard, Zeus: A Study in Ancient Religion, Volume III: Zeus God of the Dark Sky (Earthquakes, Clouds, Wind, Dew, Rain, Meteorites), Part I: Text and Notes, Cambridge University Press 1940. Internet Archive
 Euripides, Ion, translated by Robert Potter in The Complete Greek Drama, edited by Whitney J. Oates and Eugene O'Neill, Jr. Volume 1. New York. Random House. 1938.
 Gantz, Timothy, Early Greek Myth: A Guide to Literary and Artistic Sources, Johns Hopkins University Press, 1996, Two volumes:  (Vol. 1),  (Vol. 2).
 Hesiod, Theogony, in The Homeric Hymns and Homerica with an English Translation by Hugh G. Evelyn-White, Cambridge, MA.,Harvard University Press; London, William Heinemann Ltd. 1914. Online version at the Perseus Digital Library.
 Horace, The Odes and Carmen Saeculare of Horace. John Conington. trans. London. George Bell and Sons. 1882. Online version at the Perseus Digital Library.
 Hyginus, Gaius Julius, The Myths of Hyginus. Edited and translated by Mary A. Grant, Lawrence: University of Kansas Press, 1960.
 Lyne,  R. O. A. M., Horace: Behind the Public Poetry, Yale University Press, 1995. .
 Seneca. Tragedies, Volume I: Hercules. Trojan Women. Phoenician Women. Medea. Phaedra. Edited and translated by John G. Fitch. Loeb Classical Library 62. Cambridge, MA: Harvard University Press, 2002. .
 Silius Italicus, Punica with an English translation by J. D. Duff, Volume II, Cambridge, MA., Harvard University Press; London, William Heinemann, Ltd. 1934. Internet Archive

Children of Gaia
Gigantes
Deeds of Zeus
Deeds of Ares
Hephaestus